Cayton is a village and civil parish in the Scarborough borough of North Yorkshire, England,  south of Scarborough.

History
Cayton is mentioned in the Domesday book as "Caitune".

In 2010, Cayton won a Silver-gilt, at the Britain in Bloom awards. This was achieved despite earlier sabotage attacks on a number of flower beds in the village.

Second World War
Second World War defences were constructed around Cayton. They included a section post and several pillboxes. Many of the remaining defences have been subject to coastal erosion.

The village sent 45 men to the First World War, and 60 to the Second. There was not a single fatality amongst the combined 105 men, with only one soldier suffering a serious injury during the First World War, then being subsequently spared by a German Officer.

Cayton Bay Landslide
In April 2008, a major landslip caused tons of earth to slip down the cliff side at the edge of Cayton Bay close to Osgodby, leaving bungalows on the Knipe Point estate teetering on the edge of the cliff. The slope movements, caused by water seeping through the clay cliffs, resulted in three properties being demolished and other properties in the Knipe Point Estate and the A165 Filey Road being threatened. A number of the remaining homes are still at risk as the slope and the National Trust land below it are designated as a Site of Special Scientific Interest (SSSI); despite an initial outlay of £90,000 by Scarborough Borough Council and the National Trust an engineered solution could not be found that would satisfy the technical, environmental and cost-effective criteria set by Natural England, the Environment Agency and Defra.

Governance
An electoral ward of the same name exists. The population of this ward at the 2011 UK census was 4,152. Cayton parish had a population of 2,328 a decrease on the 2001 UK census figure of 2,407.

Community
Cayton County Primary School educates pupils aged 4 to 11 years.

Cayton Bay forms one of a series of large sweeping sandy bays on the edge of the North Yorkshire National Park which run from Bridlington in the south to Whitby in the north. There is a surf shop and car park on the cliff tops above the bay.

Cayton railway station on the Yorkshire Coast Line from Hull to Scarborough served the village until it closed on 5 May 1952.

Notable people
The village is the birthplace of Mikey North, who portrays Gary Windass, in Coronation Street. North attended the nearby George Pindar School.

References

Further reading
William Foot - Beaches, fields, streets, and hills ... the anti-invasion landscapes of England, 1940 (Council for British Archaeology, 2006)

External links

 Cayton Village web site

 Cayton Parish Council web site

 Cayton Bay web site

 Landslide at Knipe Point, Cayton Bay, North Yorkshire British Geological Survey

Villages in North Yorkshire
Civil parishes in North Yorkshire